Güven Sazak (1935 in Ankara, Turkey – 25 April 2011) was the 40th President of Türkiye Süper Ligi club Fenerbahçe SK between 1993 and 1994. He has been a member of the club since 1958.

He was also a member of the Fenerbahçe SK Board in 1974–75, 1978–80 and 1982–83 Boards.

Güven Sazak is the brother of Gün Sazak (1932–1980), a nationalist politician and former Minister of Customs and Monopolies, who was assassinated by leftist militants. His other brother, Yılmaz Sazak, served as the President of the Turkey Athletic Federation.

References

External links 
 Fenerbahçe official website presidents page

1935 births
2011 deaths
Fenerbahçe S.K. presidents
Fenerbahçe S.K. board members
Turkish businesspeople